Aaron Patrick Tumwa (born 27 September 1993) is an Antiguan  footballer who last played as a defender for Bishop's Stortford.

Club career
Tumwa started his career at Watford, and in February 2012 was loaned to Isthmian Premier Division side Harrow Borough while still a second-year scholar. He signed a one-year professional deal in summer 2012 at the end of his two-year scholarship. The following season, he again spent time on loan in the Isthmian Premier Division, joining Wealdstone from the beginning of November 2012 to late January 2013. He was released by Watford in summer 2013 having not played a game for the first-team.

Tumwa subsequently joined another Championship club, Blackburn Rovers, in August 2013, joining their development team. He was released in May 2014 having not played a game for the first-team.

In August 2014 Tumwa signed for Conference South club Farnborough.

In July 2015 Tumwa signed for Conference National club Bromley. After making five league appearances, he joined Hayes & Yeading United on loan in March 2016.

In June 2016 he joined Margate.

International career
Tumwa was one of five uncapped overseas based players who committed to represent the country in November 2014 for their matches in the group stages of the 2014 Caribbean Cup. He made his full international debut on 12 November 2014 in a match against Haiti.

International goals
Scores and results list Antigua and Barbuda's goal tally first.

References

External links

1993 births
Living people
Footballers from the London Borough of Harrow
English footballers
Black British sportspeople
English people of Kenyan descent
English sportspeople of African descent
English sportspeople of Antigua and Barbuda descent
Antigua and Barbuda footballers
Antigua and Barbuda international footballers
Antigua and Barbuda people of Kenyan descent
Sportspeople of Kenyan descent
Watford F.C. players
Harrow Borough F.C. players
Wealdstone F.C. players
Blackburn Rovers F.C. players
Farnborough F.C. players
Bromley F.C. players
Hayes & Yeading United F.C. players
Hendon F.C. players
Association football defenders
Isthmian League players
National League (English football) players
2014 Caribbean Cup players
Margate F.C. players